Martello can refer to:

People
 Alan Martello (born 1952), former Australian rules football player 
 Alfonse Martello D'Amato (born 1937), New York politician
 Candice Martello (better known as Hemming), singer-songwriter
 Cesar Martello, politician in Ontario
 Charles Martel of Anjou (1271-1295), titular king of Hungary
 Leo Martello (1931-2000), pagan
 Tullio Martello (1841-1918), Italian economist
 Wan Ling Martello (born 1958), businesswomen

Other
 Martello tower, a Napoleonic War defensive structure in Britain, Ireland, Canada and other countries
 Martello radar, a type of early-warning radar
 Martello, the Italian name for Martell, South Tyrol
 Martello, the name of a LB&SCR A1 class railway locomotive